Indutolaelaps is a genus of mites in the family Leptolaelapidae. There are at least two described species in Indutolaelaps.

Species
These two species belong to the genus Indutolaelaps:
 Indutolaelaps jiroftensis Hajizadeh, Mortazavi, Balooch-Shahriari & Castilho, 2017
 Indutolaelaps squamosus Karg, 1997

References

Mesostigmata
Articles created by Qbugbot